Ngau Chi Wan Village is a village in Ngau Chi Wan, in Wong Tai Sin District, Hong Kong.

History
In the past the village was mostly inhabited by war and political refugees from mainland China.

In the 2019 and 2020 policy addresses, the chief executive stated that the government intends to take back possession of the remaining Ngau Chi Wan Village and to redevelop the land into high-density public housing.

Transport
Ngau Chi Wan Village is served by the Choi Hung station of the MTR.

See also
 Cha Kwo Ling
 Nga Tsin Wai Tsuen

References

Ngau Chi Wan
Villages in Wong Tai Sin District, Hong Kong